Kjerkeberget is a mountain in Nordmarka, Oslo, Norway.

It is the highest point in the county and municipality of Oslo. It lies on the border of Oslo and the municipality Lunner in Viken, between the lakes Sandungen in the southeast and Katnosa in the northwest.

The first element is kjerke f 'church', the last element is the finite form of berg n 'rocky mountain'. (Several mountains in Norway are called 'the church', because of some likeness in shape with a church). The word kjerke is the form in the dialect of the area - in Bokmål kirke, and in Nynorsk kyrkje.

During World War II, Milorg used this hill as a site for parachute drops. On 4 October 1942, Milorg's District 13 received its first paradrop here. In the paradrop were four people: Tor Helliesen, Jan Allan, Ruben Larsen and Johannes S. Andersen.

References

Highest points of Norwegian counties
Mountains of Viken
Mountains of Oslo